"You Gotta Be My Baby" is a song written and recorded by George Jones.  It was his second Top 10 hit on Starday Records, peaking at #7 on the country singles chart.  That same year, he sang "You Gotta Be My baby" at his first appearance on The Grand Ole Opry.  According to Bob Allen's book George Jones: The Life and Times of a Honky Tonk Legend, Jones nearly walked off the Opry show when one of the WSM officials told him he could not take his guitar with him onstage but relented after Opry regular George Morgan handed him a guitar owned by Little Jimmy Dickens and promised he would take responsibility. In the video biography Same Ole Me, George recalled, "I was just so nervous.  This was the biggest thing that could ever happen to anybody in the world and I was just shakin'.  I mean just truly shakin' all over."

Discography

References

1956 songs
George Jones songs
Songs written by George Jones
Starday Records singles